The first competition weekend of the 2014–15 ISU Speed Skating World Cup was held in the Meiji Hokkaido-Tokachi Oval in Obihiro, Japan, from Friday, 14 November, until Sunday, 16 November 2014.

Pavel Kulizhnikov of Russia made a successful World Cup debut by taking the silver medal in the men's first 500 m race on Friday, and then winning both the 1000 m race on Saturday and the second 500 m race on Sunday. Sven Kramer of the Netherlands won gold medals in both 5000 m and team pursuit.

Ireen Wüst of the Netherlands managed to win three gold medals over the weekend, in the women's 1500 and 3000 m races, and as part of the Dutch team in the team pursuit. She also won a silver medal in the 1000 m competition. Lee Sang-hwa of South Korea took the gold medal in both 500 m races.

No world records were set during the weekend, but in the women's 500 m, Vanessa Bittner of Austria set a new national record on both senior and junior level in the A division of the Sunday race, after having won the B division on Friday.

Martin Hänggi of Switzerland, at age 46, set a record as the oldest participant at a World Cup event when he skated in the 5000 m race.

Schedule
The detailed schedule of events:

All times are JST (UTC+9).

Medal summary

Men's events

 In mass start, race points are accumulated during the race. The skater with most race points is the winner.

Women's events

 In mass start, race points are accumulated during the race. The skater with most race points is the winner.

References

 
1
Isu World Cup, 2014-15, 1
Sport in Hokkaido